Thomas John Heiden (born July 17, 1945) is a US-based Trial lawyer and Professor of Intensive Trial Advocacy at Cornell University Law School.

Early life and education 
Born in Brooklyn, New York and raised in Detroit, Michigan, Heiden graduated from University of Detroit Jesuit High School and Academy in 1963. He holds a BA degree from University of Notre Dame (1967) and a JD from  Cornell Law School (1971).

Career 
Heiden has tried cases in every region of the US. His practice focuses on difficult and high-profile lawsuits. He is  known for winning the high-profile US$4 billion Pro Football Lockout Fund trial. He is currently a Professor of Intensive Trial Advocacy at Cornell University Law School and  a Fellow of the American College of Trial Lawyers.

Heiden is a Partner of Latham & Watkins an international law firm. He is the former Chair of Latham & Watkins Mass Torts and Products Liability trial practice. He is a member of Equal Justice Works’ Board of Counselors, Cornell University Law School Professor of  Intensive Trial Advocacy, and University of Notre Dame, College of Arts and Letters Advisory Board. He is also a member of Board of Directors, Chicago Sports Commission.

Personal life 
Heiden is married to Jane Heiden with five children.

References

External links
  Latham & Watkins Website
 Cornell University Law School Website

Living people
1945 births
American lawyers
People associated with Latham & Watkins
University of Notre Dame alumni
Cornell Law School alumni
Cornell University faculty